Starting in the 12th century, the Margraviate, later Electorate, of Brandenburg was in conflict with the neighboring Duchy of Pomerania over frontier territories claimed by them both, and over the status of the Pomeranian duchy, which Brandenburg claimed as a fief, whereas Pomerania claimed Imperial immediacy. The conflict frequently turned into open war, and despite occasional success, none of the parties prevailed permanently until the House of Pomerania died out in 1637. Brandenburg would by then have naturally have prevailed, but this was hindered by the contemporary Swedish occupation of Pomerania, and the conflict continued between Sweden and Brandenburg-Prussia until 1815, when Prussia incorporated Swedish Pomerania into her Province of Pomerania.

Early medieval prelude

In the 10th century, the area of the future Brandenburg and Pomerania was inhabited by West Slavic tribes, collectively known as Wends. Roughly, the tribes east of the Oder and north of the Warta (Warthe) rivers constituted the Pomeranians and the tribes west of the Oder the Luticians. The classification is uncertain for the tribes living close to the lower Oder, that is the Velunzani on the islands in the Oder estuary, the Prissani on the eastern bank of the lower Oder, and the Ukrani and Recani on the western bank of the lower Oder, which became known as the Uckermark.

The tribes west of the Oder were organized in marches of the Ottonian (Liudolfing) realm, which became the Holy Roman Empire with the coronation of Otto I, Holy Roman Emperor in 962. The marches set up in the area of the future Brandenburg and Pomerania were the Billung March in the north, and the Saxon Eastern March in the south; the boundary was the Peene river. The Saxon Eastern March was soon partitioned, with the area of future northern Brandenburg and southwestern Pomerania re-organized in the Northern March. A rebellion of the Liuticians overthrew the margraves' rule in most of the Northern and Billung marches between 983 and 995. In the 11th century, the Liutician confederation collapsed due to internal struggles, leaving its territory vulnerable to its neighbors' campaigns, including expeditions of the margraves of the Northern March.

House of Ascania vs House of Pomerania
Wartislaw I, Duke of Pomerania and first verified member of the House of Pomerania, conquered the Peene and Tollense areas west of the lower Oder from the Luticians during the 1120s. Albert (Albrecht) the Bear, invested with the March of Lusatia in 1123, was ready to succeed deceased Henry, Count of Stade as margrave of the Northern March in 1128, and was invested with the march by Holy Roman Emperor Lothair of Supplinburg in 1134, after he had already secured his succession of Pribislaw of the Hevelli in 1129. In 1128, Albert participated in the organization of the mission of Otto of Bamberg in the Lutician areas held by Wartislaw I of Pomerania, and supplied him with an escort. When in 1136 Emperor Lothair gave lands in the Peene area to Otto's bishopric of Bamberg, Albert was asked to approve first.

Focused on the Northern March, Albert renounced his post as the margrave of Lusatia in 1136, which was then fused into the March of Meißen and became the basis of the state of the House of Wettin. In 1138, Conrad III of Germany also invested Albert the Bear with the Duchy of Saxony, but Albert resigned in 1142 due to the opposition of the Saxon nobility, who had favoured and eventually installed then minor Henry the Lion as their duke.

In 1147, Albert participated in the Wendish Crusade to the Pomeranian strongholds of Demmin and Stettin, which however did not result in the acquisition of territories — the size of the Northern March actually controlled by Albert differed significantly from what Emperor Lothair had originally promised. Instead, as a result of the crusade, several Saxon nobles had established petty realms in the march, and the Pomeranians still held vast areas south of the Peene river as well as the Uckermark. Albert however succeeded Pribislaw in the Hevellian territories in 1150, and when he defeated Jaxa of Köpenick and incorporated the latter's territory into his march in 1157, the term Margraviate of Brandenburg replaced the designation Northern March. Albert upheld his claims to Western Pomerania, and campaigned in the Pomeranian-held Uckermark since 1157.

Albert the Bear's successor in Saxony, Henry the Lion, had by then established himself as one of the most powerful nobles in Germany. In pursuit of his own interests in the Wendish territories and with Danish support, Henry defeated his rebellious Obodrite subjects and their Pomeranian allies in the Battle of Verchen near the Pomeranian stronghold of Demmin in 1164. As a consequence, the Pomeranian dukes became Henry's vassals, and supported Henry in subsequent campaigns against the margraves of Brandenburg. However, Henry finally lost the struggle he was engaged in with Holy Roman Emperor Barbarossa, and in 1180 was deprived of his ducal titles. The Pomeranian duke then pledged allegiance to Barbarossa in 1181, thwarting Ascanian ambitions.

Constant Danish military pressure resulted in Danish vassalage of Pomerania in 1184/85. The Ascanian margraves launched several expeditions into Danish Pomerania between 1198 and 1199, and between 1211 and 1214. Despite a temporary sack of Stettin in 1214 and more permanent territorial gains in the Finow area, they were unable to establish themselves in Pomerania, and Danish superiority even led Frederick II, Holy Roman Emperor to renounce all German claims to the area in favour of Denmark in 1214. By then, the margraves restricted themselves to guard the contemporary Brandenburg-Pomeranian frontier by erecting the Oderberg fortress "contra Sclavos" in 1214. Only after the utter defeat of the Danish forces in the Battle of Bornhöved in 1227, was the area reclaimed by the empire. The Brandenburgian margraves then re-enforced their claims on Pomerania, and were invested with the duchy by Frederick II in 1231 in Ravenna.

In the 1230s, the Margraviate of Brandenburg was ruled in common by two brothers of the House of Ascania, John I and Otto III, while the Duchy of Pomerania was partially divided and ruled by two cousins of the House of Pomerania, Wartislaw III of Pomerania-Demmin and Barnim I of Pomerania-Stettin. Johann I of Brandenburg married a daughter of Valdemar Sejr, king of Denmark, and therewith came into possession of half of the terra Wolgast in Pomerania. He then forced Wartislaw III into the Treaty of Kremmen in 1236: Wartislaw III had to recognize Brandenburgian overlordship and succession in Pomerania-Demmin, and cede his territories south of Demmin to Brandenburg.

Also in the 1230s, Barnim I had sold the southern Uckermark between Templin and Angermünde to the margraves, and renounced his claims on the Barnim and Teltow areas. In the subsequent Treaty of Landin (Hohenlandin) in 1250, Barnim I formally accepted Brandenburgian overlordship and ceded the northern Uckermark to Brandenburg, but in turn received Johann's part of Wolgast and managed to rescind the succession clause of Kremmen. Barnim I had to make further territorial concessions when Brandenburg established her Neumark ("New March") along the Warthe (Warta) river in the second half of the 13th century, and in 1267 married Mechthild, daughter of Otto III of Brandenburg.

Barnim I had inherited Pomerania-Demmin after Wartislaw III died without issue in 1264, but the duchy was again internally divided in 1295 – this time into a northern part, Pomerania-Wolgast, and a southern part, Pomerania-Stettin. In 1302, Otto I of Pomerania-Stettin, grandson of Brandenburgian margrave Otto III, made peace with Brandenburg. Tensions with Pomerania-Wolgast eased when Waldemar became the Brandenburgian margrave in 1309, and Brandenburg pawned Schlawe-Stolp to Pomerania in the Treaty of Templin, concluded in 1317. With Waldemar's death without issue, the House of Ascania died out.

House of Pomerania vs House of Wittelsbach

The House of Wittelsbach (also House of Bavaria) did not immediately succeed the House of Ascania as margraves of Brandenburg: Since the electors of the Holy Roman Emperor disagreed in 1314, a war ensued between the two candidates Louis of Wittelsbach and Frederick of Habsburg that lasted until 1322, when Louis prevailed in the Battle of Mühldorf. Thus, the death of Ascanian margrave Waldemar was not followed by a proper investiture of another noble with the Margraviate of Brandenburg due to the lack of an established emperor.

The closest relative of deceased Waldemar was his ten-year-old cousin Henry, who is unlikely to have had valid claims on the margraviate. Henry was the son of Waldermar's uncle Henry of Landsberg, a distant relative of both Wartislaw IV, Duke of Pomerania-Wolgast and Rudolf I, Duke of Saxe-Wittenberg from another line of the House of Ascania, who was married to a daughter of former Ascanian margrave Otto V. Wartislaw IV quickly advanced into eastern Brandenburg, took the boy into custody, had the local nobility formally declare him Henry's custodian, and acted as the de facto ruler of the margraviate.

Rudolf I on the other hand declared himself custodian of Waldemar's widow and temporarily took over her possessions in western and central Brandenburg (Havelland, Teltow and Barnim). Rudolf I's plans were thwarted when Waldemar's widow married Otto of Brunswick in late 1319. Yet, he continued his occupation of Brandenburgian territories and by 1320 controlled Havelland, Teltow, Barnim, Zauche and Lower Lusatia. Like Wartislaw IV, Rudolf I tried to take young Henry into custody, and probably managed to do so in early 1320. Henry died in the summer of 1320. In anticipation of a possible take-over of Brandenburg by a rival who then could claim Pomerania as a Brandenburgian fief, the Pomeranian dukes took their duchy as a fief from the bishops of Cammin the same year.

Meanwhile, other neighbors of Brandenburg also annexed frontier areas of the seemingly vacated margraviate – Silesia took the Görlitz area, Bohemia the Bautzen area, and Mecklenburgian forces occupied the Prignitz and advanced into the Uckermark. Pomeranian forces had also advanced into the Uckermark, halted the Mecklenburgian campaign and occupied the Prenzlau and Pasewalk areas. In addition, the Pomeranian dukes as well as Rudolf I of Saxe-Wittenberg claimed the Lebus area.

After Louis of the House of Wittelsbach, later crowned Louis IV, Holy Roman Emperor, had decided the war against the House of Habsburg in his favour in September 1322, he gave the Margraviate of Brandenburg to his seven-year-old son, Louis V "the Brandenburger" in 1323. The formal investiture was issued in 1324, and included the Duchy of Pomerania as a Brandenburgian fief. Rudolf I in late 1324 withdrew from Brandenburgian areas in turn for a compensation, The House of Wittelsbach subsequently gained control over the margraviate until they were in full charge in 1343. During this process, the Pomeranians had to withdraw from the Uckermark after a series of battles throughout the late 1320s and early 1330s. In 1330, they took their duchy as a papal fief to circumvent Brandenburg's claims. In 1338, they concluded a peace with Brandenburg, who renounced her claims on overlordship but maintained the right of succession.

In 1348 the conman "Falscher Waldemar" pretended to be Waldemar, Margrave of Brandenburg, claiming he had been declared dead erroneously while on a pilgrimage to the Holy Land. Probably a strawman of Charles IV, Holy Roman Emperor of the House of Luxembourg, and/or the Anhaltine and Saxon branches of the House of Ascania, he was invested with the margraviate between 1148 and 1150, and took on his position as a margrave with military support of Charles IV and the Ascanians. The House of Wittelsbach was expelled from most of Brandenburg and only controlled the Neumark and some adjacent areas. Together with Denmark, the Pomeranian dukes sided with the Wittelsbachs, and the alliance had already gained ground in 1350 when Charles IV re-invested the House of Wittelsbach with Brandenburg. Louis VI the Roman, margrave between 1351 and 1365, had to re-establish his rule against the opposition of the Ascanians, which he accomplished by 1355. During this process, the Brandenburg-Pomeranian border in the Uckermark was settled in 1354.

When war broke out again in the beginning of the 1370s between the Pomeranian dukes and Louis VI' successor Otto V "the lazy", Pomerania was allied to Charles IV: Following a policy of territorial expansion and economical consolidation of his Kingdom of Bohemia, Charles IV of the House of Luxembourg had already before Louis IV the Roman's death in 1365 concluded a treaty with both Louis IV and his brother, Otto V, for succession of Charles IV's son Wenzel (Wenceslaus) IV in Brandenburg. Furthermore, Otto V had laid Brandenburg's administration in Charles IV's hands for six years in 1365. In 1373, Charles IV forced Otto V to sign the Treaty of Fürstenwalde: Otto V renounced his claims to Brandenburg (since the Golden Bull of 1356 an electorate) in favour of the House of Luxembourg in return for a compensation with 300,000 gulden, paid by pawning to him parts of New Bohemia (Charles IV's designation for his gains in the Upper Palatinate).

House of Luxembourg vs House of Pomerania

The Pomeranian dukes were on good terms with Charles IV, who gained the Electorate of Brandenburg for his House of Luxembourg de facto from 1365 to 1371, and de jure in 1373. Charles IV had granted the House of Pomerania their Duchy of Pomerania as an imperial fief, and border disputes were settled or suspended.

Charles IV's heirs did not continue his policy of territorial integration and economical consolidation in Brandenburg: instead, the electorate faced internal partitions and economical decay. The Pomeranian dukes discontinued the formerly good relations with the Luxembourgians and successfully campaigned in the Uckermark on their own initiative or as allies of Brandenburg's opponents, shifting the border with Brandenburg southwards beyond Prenzlau. In 1411, the Luxembourgians resigned from the electorate, and transferred their title to Frederick IV, Burgrave of Nuremberg of the House of Hohenzollern (also House of Zollern), who started his reign in Brandenburg as Frederick I.

House of Hohenzollern vs House of Pomerania

When Frederick I of the House of Hohenzollern took over the Electorate of Brandenburg in 1411, he and his successors restricted the influence of the local nobles, towns and clergy, and followed a policy of territorial expansion. Since the eastern frontier with Pomerania, the Neumark, was pawned to the Teutonic Order state from 1402 to 1455, the western frontier (Uckermark) was in the focus of the Brandenburg–Pomeranian conflict: The first major battle between the Pomeranian and Hohenzollern armies took place in 1412 at Kremmer Damm, only one year after Frederick I had taken over the electorate.

The Duchy of Pomerania was at that time internally divided into petty realms, each such Teilherzogtum was ruled by a distinct member of the House of Pomerania. The first series of wars was primarily fought between Frederick I and the dukes of Pomerania-Stettin, allied to the powerful Brandenburgian noble family von Quitzow, and resulted in some Brandenburgian gains, the expulsion of the von Quiltzows, the imperial ban of the dukes and towns of Pomerania-Stettin, and finally a temporary peace between Brandenburg and Pomerania concluded in Eberswalde in 1415. The Pomeranian dukes allied with the dukes of Mecklenburg in 1418 and renewed their attacks, but were decisively defeated by Brandenburgian forces in the streets of Angermünde in 1420 and had to hand over the Uckermark in the subsequent Treaty of Perleberg. In 1425, the anti-Brandenburgian alliance launched a more successful campaign, after which the Uckermark was divided between Brandenburg and Pomerania in a second treaty of Eberswalde in 1427.

In 1444, war about the border in the Uckermark broke out anew. After four years of fighting, Brandenburg and Pomerania in the Peace of Prenzlau (1448) settled for a division of the Uckermark that only slightly differed from the division of 1427. In 1459, Brandenburg gained a few strongholds in the Uckermark for aiding several Pomeranian dukes in an internal struggle with their relative Eric II.

With the death of Otto III of Pomerania-Stettin in 1464, a series of wars was fought for Otto III's succession, claimed by both the House of Pomerania and the House of Hohenzollern. The battlefields were the Pomerania-Stettin, Uckermark and Neumark areas, and the war was halted only for short periods by the Treaty of Soldin (1466) and Treaty of Prenzlau (1472). The Treaty of Prenzlau (1479) finally ended the war, largely confirming the terms of the previous treaties: Pomerania-Stettin remained under the rule of the House of Pomerania, who in turn became vassals of the electors of Brandenburg.

The Peace of Prenzlau was followed by a series of negotiations, which led to the conclusion of the preliminary Treaty of Pyritz in 1493, and the final Treaty of Grimnitz in 1529: The Duchy of Pomerania became an imperial immediate fief, but the members of the House of Pomerania had to receive it in the presence of Brandenburgian representatives, and Brandenburg was granted the right of succession in the Pomeranian duchy in case the House of Pomerania became extinct.

House of Hohenzollern vs House of Sweden

Seven years before the last duke of the House of Pomerania died, which would have led to Brandenburgian succession in the Duchy of Pomerania, Swedish forces had occupied Pomerania in the course of the Thirty Years' War. By the death of Bogislaw XIV, Duke of Pomerania in 1637, Sweden refused to hand over the duchy to Brandenburg. When the war ended, Sweden and Brandenburg agreed in the Peace of Westphalia (1648) and the subsequent Treaty of Stettin (1653) to partition Pomerania by a divide just east of the Oder: Western Pomerania became Swedish Pomerania, while Farther Pomerania became Brandenburgian Pomerania.

Brandenburg, later Brandenburg-Prussia, gained Swedish Pomerania step by step in the following centuries: most of the Swedish strip east of the Oder in the Peace of Saint-Germain-en-Laye that ended the Scanian War in 1679, Swedish Pomerania south of the Peene and east of the Peenestrom rivers with Stettin in the Treaty of Frederiksborg and Treaty of Stockholm that ended the Great Northern War in 1720, and the remainder with Rügen, Stralsund and Greifswald in the Congress of Vienna that ended the Napoleonic Wars in 1815. The former Swedish part was then merged with the former Brandenburgian part and to become the Prussian Province of Pomerania.

Sources

References

Bibliography

History of Pomerania
Margraviate of Brandenburg